Kowŏn station is a railway station of the Korean State Railway in Kowŏn-ŭp, Kowŏn County, South Hamgyŏng, North Korea. It is the junction where the P'yŏngra Line, which connects P'yŏngyang to Rajin, meets the Kangwŏn Line running from Kowŏn to P'yŏnggang.

History
Kowŏn station, along with the rest of the Okp'yŏng-Kowŏn-Kŭmya section of the former Hamgyong Line, was opened by the Japanese on 21 September 1916.

References

Railway stations in North Korea
Buildings and structures in South Hamgyong Province
Railway stations opened in 1916
1916 establishments in Korea